Dangerous Liaisons is a 1988 American film adaptation of a Christopher Hampton play based on Les Liaisons dangereuses, a French novel by Choderlos de Laclos.

Dangerous Liaisons may also refer to:

 Les Liaisons dangereuses, a French epistolary novel by Choderlos de Laclos published in 1782, the source work for all later adaptions
 Les liaisons dangereuses (film), a French adaptation by Roger Vadim released in 1959
 Les liaisons dangereuses (play), Christopher Hampton's 1985 play based on the novel
 The Dangerous Liaisons, a 1994 opera by Conrad Susa, adapted by Philip Littell from the novel
 Les Liaisons dangereuses (miniseries), a 2003 French television mini-series directed by Josée Dayan starring Catherine Deneuve, Rupert Everett, Nastassja Kinski and Leelee Sobieski.
 Dangerous Liaisons (2005 film), a 2005 gay adult film adapted by Tony DiMarco from the novel
 "Dangerous Liaisons," the sixth episode of Hidden Palms
 Dangerous Liaisons (2012 film), Chinese film directed by Hur Jin-ho, a Korean director, based on de Laclos' novel
 Dangerous Liaisons (The Vampire Diaries), a 2012 episode of the television series The Vampire Diaries
Dangerous Liaisons (Arrow), a 2017 episode of the television series Arrow
Dangerous Liaisons (Supergirl), a 2019 episode of the television series Supergirl
 "Dangerous Liaisons," a track on Black Midi's 2022 album Hellfire
 Dangerous Liaisons (TV series), a 2022 American period drama television series

See also
 Valmont (film), a 1989 film directed by Miloš Forman, based on the novel
 Liaisons dangereuses (disambiguation)
 Michael Jackson's Dangerous Liaisons